Dominic Liam del Rosario (born 14 November 1996) is a Filipino footballer who currently plays for Green Archers United of the Philippines Football League. He has also played as part of the Philippines national football team debuting for the senior side against Uzbekistan in a 2018 FIFA World Cup qualifier match.

Early life
Dominic Liam del Rosario was born in Sydney, Australia in 14 November 1996. and spent his childhood in Australia visiting the Philippines almost every year to spend time with relatives based in San Pedro, Laguna. He was born to a Filipino mother and Irish-French-Latvian father.

Club career

Youth
Austral Football Club was the first club that del Rosario entered where he played for 8 years. He switched to Liverpool Olympic where he played for two years. He was coached by his best friend's father in both Austral and Liverpool. At age 14, he decided to pursue a football career. At age 15, del Rosario played for Southwest Wanderers F.C. for a year. He also became part of the varsity football team of the John Edmondson High School as a goalkeeper as a second year student.

He entered Sydney-based World Football Club, a football academy at age 15. He went two times to Europe with the academy. He had six games against teams. He received inquiries from six coaches after a match against Sheffield United in England, but only three of which extended invitation for a trial.

Del Rosario returned to Europe for a third time, without the academy. During his third trip to Europe he had trials with the Blackpool and Manchester City Shadow Squad with the latter being a trial team for the Manchester City Academy.

Senior
Del Rosario also played for the Fairfield Lions for one season before he signed with Kaya F.C. his first Philippine club in September 2013 after an invitation from then Kaya coach, David Perković. Months earlier during the Holy Week he had training sessions with Stallion F.C. He also received offer from Blackburn but he was leaving for England at that time shortly.

He had a brief stint with then Division-2 sides, JP Voltes F.C. in 2015. Playing for the club on a loan basis, del Rosario helped the club achieve promotion to Division 1 after winning a two-legged play-off of the 2015 United Football League season. However in the 2016 season, Division 2 was merged into Division 1. Del Rosario returned to Kaya.

After a stint with Kaya, del Rosario joined newly-formed side Ilocos United F.C. of the Philippines Football League, a league considered to be the successor of the UFL.

In August 2020, del Rosario joined NWSF Super League club Macquarie Dragons.

International career

Philippines U21
Del Rosario represented the Philippines at the youth level. He debuted for the Philippine U21 national team at the 2014 Hassanal Bolkiah Trophy where he also made his first assist.

Philippines U23
Del Rosario was called up to the Philippines U23 national team for the 2015 Southeast Asian Games. He made his debut in a 1–5 defeat against Myanmar U23.

Philippines
He debuted for the senior side in a 2018 FIFA World Cup qualifier match against Uzbekistan in 25 March 2016 in Tashkent. He came in as a substitute at that match into 2 minutes of extra time in the second half for Luke Woodland.

References

1996 births
Living people
Soccer players from Sydney
Citizens of the Philippines through descent
Filipino footballers
Philippines international footballers
Filipino expatriates in Australia
Filipino people of Irish descent
Filipino people of Latvian descent
Filipino people of Spanish descent
Filipino people of French descent
Australian people of Filipino descent
Association football midfielders
Kaya F.C. players
JPV Marikina F.C. players
Ilocos United F.C. players